Nahanni Butte Water Aerodrome  was adjacent to the community on the South Nahanni River and was open seasonally from the middle of June until October. It was located near Nahanni Butte, Northwest Territories, Canada, east of the Nahanni National Park Reserve, on an arm of the South Nahanni River.

See also
 Nahanni Butte Airport

References

Defunct seaplane bases in the Northwest Territories